is a Japanese actress and voice actress from Tokyo, Japan. She is affiliated with Production Baobab.

Filmography

Anime
1999
 Excel Saga (Hyatt)
2010
 Baka and Test (Hazuki Shimada, Miho Satō, Yuuji Sakamoto (young))
 Lilpri (Marukō Takashirō)
 Nura: Rise of the Yokai Clan (Natsumi Torii)
 Sound of the Sky (Seiya)
2011
 Baka and Test 2 (Hazuki Shimada)
 Dog Days (Riselle Conchiglie)
 Manyū Hiken-chō (Ofuji)
 Nura: Rise of the Yokai Clan: Demon Capital (Natsumi Torii)
 Ro-Kyu-Bu! (Toshima)
 Boku wa Tomodachi ga Sukunai (Miki)
2012
 Another (Aya Ayano)
 Battle Spirits (Hajime Hinobori)
 Dog Days' (Riselle Conchiglie)
 Dusk Maiden of Amnesia (Asa)
 High School DxD (Shuriya)
 Medaka Box Abnormal (Otome Yunomae)
 Daily Lives of High School Boys (Hidenori's neighbour)
 Mobile Suit Gundam AGE (Arabel Zoi (young))
 Psycho-Pass (Candy)
2013
 Diabolik Lovers (Beatrix)
 Haganai NEXT (Miki)
 Hakkenden: Eight Dogs of the East (Atsushi)
 Leviathan The Last Defense (Lagon)
2014
 If Her Flag Breaks (Fū Gondawara)
 Psycho-Pass 2 (Candy)
2017
 Two Car (Nene Itagaki)
2020
 Cap Kakumei Bottleman (Kōta Kōga)
2022
 Cap Kakumei Bottleman DX (Kōta Kōga)
 Raven of the Inner Palace (Ishiha)

OVA
 Baka and Test: Matsuri (Hazuki Shimada, Ritsuko Iwashita)
 Hime Gal Paradise (Masumi)
 Otome wa Boku ni Koishiteru (Yū Kashiwagi)

Dubbing roles
 The Chaser - Eun-ji (Kim Yoo-jung) and Ji-yeong (Kim Sun-young)
 Elephant White - Mae
 It Chapter One - Richie Tozier (Finn Wolfhard)
 It Chapter Two - Young Richie Tozier (Finn Wolfhard)
 The Good, the Bad, the Weird - Shaolin (Jeong Jae-eun) 
 Jessie (Ravi Ross)
 Olivia (Francine)
 Vacation - Kevin Griswold (Steele Stebbins)

References

External links
 

1985 births
Living people
Japanese video game actresses
Japanese voice actresses
Production Baobab voice actors
Voice actresses from Tokyo
21st-century Japanese actresses